Triora is a comune (municipality) in the province of Imperia in the Italian region Liguria, located about  southwest of Genoa and about  northwest of Imperia, on the border with France.

The municipality of Triora contains the frazioni (subdivisions, mainly villages and hamlets) Bregalla, Cetta, Creppo, Goina, Loreto, Monesi, Realdo, Verdeggia, and Saccarello.

Triora borders the following municipalities: Briga Alta, Castelvittorio, La Brigue (France), Mendatica, Molini di Triora, Montegrosso Pian Latte, Pigna and Saorge (France).

Culture

Triora was the site of the last witch trials held in Italy, during the Renaissance. As such it has been selected as the location of a series of folklore- and horror-themed events and festivals in recent years. It has three annual festivals: a summer witchcraft festival, in August; and two autumn celebrations: the mushroom festival in September; and Halloween, at the end of October. Then there are the many smaller fairs of the year, including the Christmas bonfire on 24 December; St. John of the Meadows, the local patron saint's day, on 23 June; a chestnut fair in October; an All Souls Day fair, at the start of November; and a series of Easter parades, before, during and after Holy Week, each Spring.

Demographic evolution

John of Triora
John of Triora, a Franciscan missionary martyr in China, was born near Triora in 1760.

Francesco Moraldo from Creppo 

During all the period of the German occupation and of the Italian Social Republic, in the village of Creppo Francesco Moraldo (born Creppo, 30 December 1906 – 28 April 2001) hid in his house and protected from deportation two German Jewish orphans, nine and eleven years old.

Moraldo had been a butler in France of the Italian banker Angelo Donati who had taken the children under his protection in July 1942 when their parents had been deported from Nice to Auschwitz.

When Donati had to take refuge in Switzerland after the Armistice of 8 September 1943,  Moraldo took the children with him to his home village. The whole population of the village, informed of the situation, helped actively with their protection, despite the danger due to fights and frequent Germans roundups in the area.

For this commitment to solidarity on 11 February 1999, the Yad Vashem Institute of Jerusalem awarded Francesco Moraldo the title of Righteous Among the Nations.

Twin towns — sister cities
Triora is twinned with:

  La Brigue, France (2006)

See also
 Parco naturale regionale delle Alpi Liguri

Notes

References

External links
 Official website
 ItalianDream.info
 Triora.org

Cities and towns in Liguria
Rescue of Jews during the Holocaust